The 2018 season was Yorkshire Diamonds' third season, in which they competed in the Women's Cricket Super League, a Twenty20 competition. The side finished fifth in the group stage, winning three of their ten matches.

The side was captained by Lauren Winfield and coached by Paul Grayson. They played two home matches apiece at Headingley Cricket Ground and Clifton Park, and one at the North Marine Road Ground.

Squad
Yorkshire Diamonds announced their 15-player squad on 11 July 2018. Age given is at the start of Yorkshire Diamonds' first match of the season (22 July 2018).

Women's Cricket Super League

Season standings

 Advanced to the Final.
 Advanced to the Semi-final.

League stage

Statistics

Batting

Bowling

Fielding

Wicket-keeping

References

Yorkshire Diamonds seasons
2018 in English women's cricket